The Bay Head Historic District is a  historic district in the borough of Bay Head in Ocean County, New Jersey, United States. This residential district located along the Atlantic Ocean was added to the National Register of Historic Places (NRHP) on February 1, 2006, for its significance in architecture and transportation from 1877 to 1940. It includes 549 contributing buildings, two contributing sites, and one contributing structure. Part of the district extends into Point Pleasant. In 2018, the L. Ron Hubbard Residence at Bay Head, a contributing building featuring Shingle style architecture, was listed individually on the NRHP. The All Saints Episcopal Church was built in 1889 and is the oldest church in the borough. The Bay Head Chapel was remodeled in the 1940s to feature Colonial Revival architecture. The Greenville Arms was designed by architect Wilson Eyre Jr., an innovator of the Shingle style.

Gallery of contributing properties

See also
National Register of Historic Places listings in Ocean County, New Jersey

References

External links

Bay Head, New Jersey
National Register of Historic Places in Ocean County, New Jersey
Historic districts on the National Register of Historic Places in New Jersey
New Jersey Register of Historic Places
Shingle Style architecture in New Jersey
Colonial Revival architecture in New Jersey